State Highway 29 (abbreviated SH-29) is an east–west state highway in the U.S. state of Oklahoma. It runs for  through Stephens Co. and Garvin Co., and has one lettered spur route.

Route description

SH-29 begins at an intersection with U.S. Highway 81 in Marlow, Oklahoma. It heads east from here, curving southeast after leaving town and eventually straightening out. The next town it passes through is the small but spread-out town of Bray.  east of Bray, it meets State Highway 76, which it has a  concurrency with. Six miles further east, SH-29 meets SH-74 at a four-way stop in Elmore City.   

SH-29 next meets Interstate 35 at its Exit 66. Soon after passing under the Interstate, SH-29 meets U.S. Highway 77, and the two highways overlap over the Washita River into Wynnewood. US-77 splits off in downtown Wynnewood, and SH-29 continues eastward for 12 more miles before ending at US-177.

SH-29A

Junction list

References

External links
SH-29 at OKHighways

029
Transportation in Stephens County, Oklahoma
Transportation in Garvin County, Oklahoma